Starlight Bowl may refer to:
Starlight Bowl (Burbank), in Burbank, California
Starlight Bowl (San Diego), in San Diego, California